Justin Fennell (born August 23, 1962) is an American multi-award-winning Christian comedian, associate pastor and founder of the Christian Comedy Association.

Biography
Fennell was born in Savannah, Georgia to Harris and Ann (née Busby) Fennell. The family lived in Savannah until Fennell was four and then the family relocated to Smyrna, Georgia. Fennell left Symrna in 1984 to attend Denver Seminary where he received a master's degree in counseling. In 1990, Fennell founded the Just-In-Time Foundation which helps raise funds for quality causes. In 2001, Fennell founded the Christian Comedy Association which is the largest network of professional Christian comedians. Fennell is an ordained minister and holds credentials in the Assemblies of God denomination.

Comedy career
Fennell started doing professional comedy in 1990. He is described as a clean comedian and a motivational speaker.

Personal life
Fennell married his wife, Dretha in 1987 and the two have three children, Nathaniel(1990), Anna Marie(1997), and Zachary(2001). The family lives in Lakeland, Florida.

References

1962 births
Living people
American male comedians
21st-century American comedians
People from Savannah, Georgia
People from Lakeland, Florida
American entertainers
Assemblies of God people